James Godrich Eschen (August 21, 1891 – September 27, 1960) was a Major League Baseball outfielder who played in  with the Cleveland Indians. He batted and threw right-handed. Eschen had ten hits in 42 at-bats, in 15 games, with a .238 batting average. He was born in Brooklyn, New York and died in Sloatsburg, New York. His son, Larry, also played in Major League Baseball, with the Philadelphia Athletics.

External links

1891 births
1960 deaths
Cleveland Indians players
Major League Baseball outfielders
Jersey City Skeeters players
Buffalo Bisons (minor league) players
Cleveland Spiders (minor league) players
New Orleans Pelicans (baseball) players
Birmingham Barons players
Sportspeople from Brooklyn
Baseball players from New York City
People from Sloatsburg, New York